Mamdouh Taha Al-Husseini Abouebaid (born 1 January 1988) is an Egyptian handball player for Al Ahly and the Egyptian national team.

References

External links

1988 births
Living people
Egyptian male handball players
Handball players at the 2016 Summer Olympics
Olympic handball players of Egypt
Competitors at the 2013 Mediterranean Games
Mediterranean Games gold medalists for Egypt
Mediterranean Games medalists in handball
21st-century Egyptian people